Liu Yu (born 1 June 1989) is a Chinese para swimmer.
Liu competed in her first Paralympic games at the 2020 Tokyo Paralympics, where she won two gold medals in the 50 metre backstroke (WR 44.68) and in the 150m Individual Medley SM4 (2:41.91).

References

1989 births
Living people
Paralympic gold medalists for China
Paralympic swimmers of China
Chinese female backstroke swimmers
Swimmers at the 2020 Summer Paralympics
Medalists at the 2020 Summer Paralympics
S4-classified Paralympic swimmers
Paralympic medalists in swimming
21st-century Chinese women